Hypnotherapy is a type of mind–body intervention in which hypnosis is used to create a state of focused attention and increased suggestibility in the treatment of a medical or psychological disorder or concern. Popularized by 17th and 18th century psychologists such as James Braid and Milton H. Erickson.

Definition 
The United States Department of Labor's Dictionary of Occupational Titles (DOT) describes the job of the hypnotherapist:"Induces hypnotic state in client to increase motivation or alter behavior patterns: Consults with client to determine nature of problem. Prepares client to enter hypnotic state by explaining how hypnosis works and what client will experience. Tests subject to determine degree of physical and emotional suggestibility. Induces hypnotic state in client, using individualized methods and techniques of hypnosis based on interpretation of test results and analysis of client's problem. May train client in self-hypnosis conditioning."

Traditional 
The form of hypnotherapy practiced by most Victorian hypnotists, including James Braid and Hippolyte Bernheim, mainly employed direct suggestion of symptom removal, with some use of therapeutic relaxation and occasionally aversion to alcohol, drugs, etc.

Ericksonian 
In the 1950s, Milton H. Erickson developed a radically different approach to hypnotism, which has subsequently become known as "Ericksonian hypnotherapy" or "Neo-Ericksonian hypnotherapy." Based on his belief that dysfunctional behaviors were defined by social tension, Erickson coopted the subject's behavior to establish rapport, a strategy he termed "utilization." Once rapport was established, he made use of an informal conversational approach to direct awareness. His methods included complex language patterns and client-specific therapeutic strategies (reflecting the nature of utilization). He claimed to have developed ways to suggest behavior changes during apparently ordinary conversation.

This divergence from tradition led some, including Andre Weitzenhoffer, to dispute whether Erickson was right to label his approach "hypnosis" at all. Erickson's foundational paper, however, considers hypnosis as a mental state in which specific types of "work" may be done, rather than a technique of induction.

The founders of neuro-linguistic programming (NLP), a method somewhat similar in some regards to some versions of hypnotherapy, claimed that they had modelled the work of Erickson extensively and assimilated it into their approach. Weitzenhoffer disputed whether NLP bears any genuine resemblance to Erickson's work.

Solution-focused 
In the 2000s, hypnotherapists began to combine aspects of solution-focused brief therapy (SFBT) with Ericksonian hypnotherapy to produce therapy that was goal-focused (what the client wanted to achieve) rather than the more traditional problem-focused approach (spending time discussing the issues that brought the client to seek help). A solution-focused hypnotherapy session may include techniques from NLP.

Cognitive/behavioral 
Cognitive behavioral hypnotherapy (CBH) is an integrated psychological therapy employing clinical hypnosis and cognitive behavioral therapy (CBT). The use of CBT in conjunction with hypnotherapy may result in greater treatment effectiveness. A meta-analysis of eight different researches revealed "a 70% greater improvement" for patients undergoing an integrated treatment to those using CBT only.

In 1974, Theodore X. Barber and his colleagues published a review of the research which argued, following the earlier social psychology of Theodore R. Sarbin, that hypnotism was better understood not as a "special state" but as the result of normal psychological variables, such as active imagination, expectation, appropriate attitudes, and motivation. Barber introduced the term "cognitive-behavioral" to describe the nonstate theory of hypnotism, and discussed its application to behavior therapy.

The growing application of cognitive and behavioral psychological theories and concepts to the explanation of hypnosis paved the way for a closer integration of hypnotherapy with various cognitive and behavioral therapies.

Many cognitive and behavioral therapies were themselves originally influenced by older hypnotherapy techniques, e.g., the systematic desensitisation of Joseph Wolpe, the cardinal technique of early behavior therapy, was originally called "hypnotic desensitisation" and derived from the Medical Hypnosis (1948) of Lewis Wolberg.

Curative 
Dr. Peter Marshall, author of A Handbook of Hypnotherapy, devised the Trance Theory of Mental Illness, which asserts that people suffering from depression, or certain other kinds of neuroses, are already living in a trance. He asserts that this means the hypnotherapist does not need to induce trance, but instead to make them understand this and lead them out of it.

Mindful 
Mindful hypnotherapy is therapy that incorporates mindfulness and hypnotherapy. A pilot study was made at Baylor University, Texas, and published in the International Journal of Clinical and Experimental Hypnosis. Dr. Gary Elkins, director of the Mind-Body Medicine Research Laboratory at Baylor University called it "a valuable option for treating anxiety and stress reduction” and "an innovative mind-body therapy". The study showed a decrease in stress and an increase in mindfulness.

Relationship to scientific medicine
Hypnotherapy practitioners occasionally attract the attention of mainstream medicine. Attempts to instill academic rigor have been frustrated by the complexity of client suggestibility, which has social and cultural aspects, including the reputation of the practitioner. Results achieved in one time and center of study have not been reliably transmitted to future generations.

In the 1700s Anton Mesmer offered pseudoscientific justification for his practices, but his rationalizations were debunked by a commission that included Benjamin Franklin.

Uses

Clinicians choose hypnotherapy to address a wide range of circumstances; however, according to Yeates (2016), people choose to have hypnotherapy for many other reasons:
"Ignoring specific issues such as performance anxiety, road rage, weight, smoking, drinking, unsafe sex, etc., those seeking hypnotherapy today do so because of ill-defined, vague feelings that: (a) their health is far from optimal; (b) their worry about past/present/future events is excessive and debilitating; (c) they are not comfortable with who they are; (d) they're not performing up to the level of their true potential; and/or (e) their lives are lacking some significant (but unidentified) thing."

Menopause 
There is evidence supporting the use of hypnotherapy in the treatment of menopause related symptoms, including hot flashes. The North American Menopause Society recommends hypnotherapy for the nonhormonal management of menopause-associated vasomotor symptoms, giving it the highest level of evidence.

Irritable bowel syndrome 
The use of hypnotherapy in treating the symptoms of irritable bowel syndrome is supported by research, including randomized controlled trials. A 2015 audit of 1000 patients undertaking gut-focused hypnotherapy in normal clinical practice found that hypnotherapy was an effective intervention for refractory IBS. Gut-directed hypnotherapy is recommended in the treatment of irritable bowel syndrome by the American College of Gastroenterology clinical guideline for the management of IBS.

Childbirth
Hypnotherapy is often applied in the birthing process and the post-natal period, but there is insufficient evidence to determine if it alleviates pain during childbirth and no evidence that it is effective against post-natal depression. Until 2012, there was no thorough research on this topic. However, in 2013 the study was conducted during which it was found that: "The use of hypnosis in childbirth leads to a decrease in the amount of pharmacological analgesia and oxytocin used, which reduces the duration of the first stage of labor". In 2013, studies were conducted in Denmark, during which it was concluded that "The self-hypnosis course improves the experience of childbirth in women and also reduces the level of fear". In 2015, a similar study was conducted in the UK by a group of researchers: "The positive experience of self-hypnosis gives a sense of calm, confidence and empowerment in childbirth". Hypnobirthing has been used by individual such as Catherine, Princess of Wales.

Bulimia
Literature shows that a wide variety of hypnotic interventions have been investigated for the treatment of bulimia nervosa, with inconclusive effect. Similar studies have shown that groups suffering from bulimia nervosa, undergoing hypnotherapy, were more exceptional to no treatment, placebos, or other alternative treatments.

Anxiety
Hypnotherapy is shown to be comparable in effectiveness to other forms of therapy, such as cognitive-behavioral therapy, that utilize relaxation techniques and imagery. It has also shown to be successful when used to reduce anxiety in those with dental anxiety and phobias.

PTSD 

Post Traumatic Stress Disorder (PTSD) and its symptoms have been shown to improve due to implementation of hypnotherapy, in both long and short term. As research continues, hypnotherapy is being more openly considered as an effective intervention for those with PTSD.

Depression 
Hypnotherapy has been show to be effective when used to treat long term depressive symptoms. It has show to be comparable to the efficacy of cognitive-behavioral therapy, and when used in tandem, efficacy seems to increase.

Other uses
Among its many other applications in other medical domains, hypnotism was used therapeutically, by some alienists in the Victorian era, to treat the condition then known as hysteria.

Modern hypnotherapy is widely accepted for the treatment of certain habit disorders, to control irrational fears, as well as in the treatment of conditions such as insomnia and addiction. Hypnosis has also been used to enhance recovery from non-psychological conditions such as after surgical procedures, in breast cancer care and even with gastro-intestinal problems.

Efficacy
 A 2003 meta-analysis on the efficacy of hypnotherapy concluded that "the efficacy of hypnosis is not verified for a considerable part of the spectrum of psychotherapeutic practice."
 In 2007, a meta-analysis from the Cochrane Collaboration found that the therapeutic effect of hypnotherapy was "superior to that of a waiting list control or usual medical management, for abdominal pain and composite primary IBS symptoms, in the short term in patients who fail standard medical therapy", with no harmful side-effects. However the authors noted that the quality of data available was inadequate to draw any firm conclusions.
 Two Cochrane reviews in 2012 concluded that there was insufficient evidence to support its efficacy in managing the pain of childbirth or post-natal depression.
 A 2014 meta-analysis that focused on hypnotherapy's efficacy on irritable bowel syndrome found that it was beneficial for short term abdominal pain and other gastrointestinal issues.
 In 2016, a literature review published in La Presse Médicale found that there is not sufficient evidence to "support the efficacy of hypnosis in chronic anxiety disorders".
 In 2019, a Cochrane review was unable to find evidence of benefit of hypnosis in smoking cessation, and suggested if there is, it is small at best.
 A 2019 meta-analysis of hypnosis as a treatment for anxiety found that "the average participant receiving hypnosis reduced anxiety more than about 79% of control participants," also noting that "hypnosis was more effective in reducing anxiety when combined with other psychological interventions than when used as a stand-alone treatment."
 In a 2022 meta-analysis on hypnotherapy's efficacy on dental anxiety, it was found that "hypnosis can also be regarded as powerful and successful method for anxiety reduction," but also stated that further research is required.

Occupational accreditation

United States 
The laws regarding hypnosis and hypnotherapy vary by state and municipality. Some states, like Colorado, Connecticut and Washington, have mandatory licensing and registration requirements, while many other states have no specific regulations governing the practice of hypnotherapy.

United Kingdom

UK National Occupational Standards
In 2002, the Department for Education and Skills developed National Occupational Standards for hypnotherapy linked to National Vocational Qualifications based on the then National Qualifications Framework under the Qualifications and Curriculum Authority. NCFE, a national awarding body, issues level four national vocational qualification diploma in hypnotherapy. Currently AIM Awards offers a Level 3 Certificate in Hypnotherapy and Counselling Skills at level 3 of the Regulated Qualifications Framework.

UK Confederation of Hypnotherapy Organisations (UKCHO)
The regulation of the hypnotherapy profession in the UK is at present the main focus of UKCHO, a non-profit umbrella body for hypnotherapy organisations. Founded in 1998 to provide a non-political arena to discuss and implement changes to the profession of hypnotherapy, UKCHO currently represents 9 of the UK's professional hypnotherapy organisations and has developed standards of training for hypnotherapists, along with codes of conduct and practice that all UKCHO registered hypnotherapists are governed by. As a step towards the regulation of the profession, UKCHO's website now includes a National Public Register of Hypnotherapists who have been registered by UKCHO's Member Organisations and are therefore subject to UKCHO's professional standards. Further steps to full regulation of the hypnotherapy profession will be taken in consultation with the Prince's Foundation for Integrated Health.

The National Council for Hypnotherapy (NCH)
The National Council for Hypnotherapy is a Professional Association, established in 1973 to create a National Membership Organisation for independent Hypnotherapy Practitioners.

Australia 
Professional hypnotherapy and use of the occupational titles hypnotherapist or clinical hypnotherapist are not government-regulated in Australia.

In 1996, as a result of a three-year research project led by Lindsay B. Yeates, the Australian Hypnotherapists Association (founded in 1949), the oldest hypnotism-oriented professional organization in Australia, instituted a peer-group accreditation system for full-time Australian professional hypnotherapists, the first of its kind in the world, which "accredit[ed] specific individuals on the basis of their actual demonstrated knowledge and clinical performance; instead of approving particular 'courses' or approving particular 'teaching institutions'" (Yeates, 1996, p.iv; 1999, p.xiv). The system was further revised in 1999.

Australian hypnotism/hypnotherapy organizations (including the Australian Hypnotherapists Association) are seeking government regulation similar to other mental health professions. However, currently hypnotherapy is not subject to government regulation through the Australian Health Practitioner Regulation Agency (AHPRA).

See also 

 Atavistic regression
 Astral projection
 Autogenic training
 Autosuggestion
 Doctor of Clinical Hypnotherapy
 Hypnotherapy in the United Kingdom
 Hypnosis
 Hypnosurgery
 The Pregnant Man and Other Cases from a Hypnotherapist's Couch
 Psychotherapy
 Royal Commission on Animal Magnetism
 Scientific skepticism
 Subconscious mind
 Suggestibility
 The Zoist: A Journal of Cerebral Physiology & Mesmerism, and Their Applications to Human Welfare

References 

 
Mind–body interventions
Medical treatments
Pseudoscience

sv:Hypnos#Hypnos till terapi